Frank Little (April 16, 1936 – December 15, 1993) was an American sports shooter. He competed in the trap event at the 1964 Summer Olympics.

References

1936 births
1993 deaths
American male sport shooters
Olympic shooters of the United States
Shooters at the 1964 Summer Olympics
People from Endicott, New York
Sportspeople from New York (state)